The following is a list of members of the American Academy of Arts and Sciences from 2020 to 2022.

2020 

 Katharine G. Abraham
 Sarita V. Adve
 Syed Babar Ali
 Maydianne C.B. Andrade
 Susan C. Antón
 Elena Aprile
 Katrina A. Armstrong
 Robert C. Armstrong
 Joan Baez
 Biman Bagchi
 Zainab Bahrani
 Houston A. Baker Jr.
 David J. Barron
 Michele Barry
 Yasmine Belkaid
 Hugo J. Bellen
 Joy M. Bergelson
 Irina G. Bokova
 Sandrine Bony
 Catherine Boone
 Eduardo S. Brondizio
 Tomiko Brown-Nagin
 Debra A. Cafaro
 Cheshire Calhoun
 Paul C. Canfield
 Blanche Capel
 Mary Carruthers
 Ana Mari Cauce
 Jeannine Cavender-Bares
 Howard Y. Chang
 Lynn W. Chang
 R. Alta Charo
 Edith Chen
 Pierre-André Chiappori
 Melissa Chiu
 Steven L. Chown
 Paul M. Churchland
 Thomas R. Clandinin
 Adela Yarbro Collins
 James P. Collins
 Kathleen Collins
 Blossom Damania
 Trisha N. Davis
 Geraldine Dawson
 Caroline Dean
 Anne Dejean
 Dave Donaldson
 Catherine L. Drennan
 John A. Dupré
 Brent Hayes Edwards
 Luis E. Eguiarte Fruns
 Santiago F. Elena Fito
 Maud Ellmann
 Beverly Marie Emerson
 Stephen Engelberg
 Nuruddin Farah
 Bernard R. Faure
 Malcolm M. Feeley
 James Ferguson
 Daniel J. Finley
 Nikky Finney
 Françoise Forges
 Lawrence D. Freedman
 Miranda Fricker
 Agustín Fuentes
 Elena Fuentes-Afflick
 Laura Gagliardi
 Giulia Galli
 Rubén Gallo
 Forrest Gander
 Miguel A. García-Garibay
 Helene D. Gayle
 Andrew Gelman
 Nancy Gertner
 Lorna Goodison
 Kevin Gover
 Vicki H. Grassian
 Karen Guillemin
 Kris D. Gutiérrez
 Margaret A. Hamburg
 Joy Harjo
 Suzan Shown Harjo
 M. Zahid Hasan
 Graham F. Hatfull
 Edgar Heap of Birds
 Joseph Heitman
 Charles J. Henry
 Thomas A. Henzinger
 Linda M. Heywood
 Anita F. Hill
 Christopher P. Hill
 Marc M. Hirschmann
 Ann Hochschild
 Helmut H Hofer
 Eric H. Holder
 Anita K. Hopper
 George M. Hornberger
 William G. Howell
 Caroline M. Hoxby
 Yonggang Huang
 Lawrence R. Jacobs
 Amaney A. Jamal
 Abigail P. Johnson
 E. Patrick Johnson
 Bryan D. Jones
 Jeffrey L. Jowell
 Dan Jurafsky
 William G. Kaelin
 Carl F. Kaestle
 Susan Kalisz
 Daniel Merson Kammen
 Shun-ichiro Karato
 Michael Kazin
 Dacher Keltner
 Renu Khator
 Philip Kim
 Paul V. Kiparsky
 Seth A. Klarman
 Wendell J. Knox
 Hanna M. Kokko
 Sally A. Kornbluth
 Rachel E. Kranton
 Loeske Kruuk
 Clark Spencer Larsen
 Erika Lee
 Ruby B. Lee
 Margaret S. Leinen
 Jeanette Lerman-Neubauer
 Daniel E. Lieberman
 Richard S. Linklater
 Diane Lipscombe
 Michal Lipson
 Adam Liptak
 Eric P. Liu
 Diana M. Liverman
 Susanna Loeb
 Susan T. Lovett
 Guillermina Lozano
 Susan Lozier
 Li Lu
 Chung-Pei Ma
 Sarah C. Mangelsdorf
 Anna K. Mapp
 Isabela Mares
 Fiona B. Marshall
 Jenny S. Martinez
 Margaret R. Martonosi
 Gary S. May
 James M. Mayer
 M. Margaret McKeown
 Katherine McKittrick
 Xiao-Li Meng
 Bruce A. Menge
 Edward Miguel
 Jennifer L. Mnookin
 Amina J. Mohammed
 Ingrid T. Monson
 Richard D. Mooney
 Rachel S. Moore
 Aileen Moreton-Robinson
 Tom W. Muir
 Denis M. Mukwege
 Gregory L. Murphy
 Steven Nadler
 Shobhana Narasimhan
 Lisa Naughton
 Victor Nee
 Alondra Nelson
 Senga Nengudi
 André Neves
 Mary D. Nichols
 Pedro A. Noguera
 Colin P. Nuckolls
 Zaki Anwar Nusseibeh
 Anne Joseph O'Connell
 Teri W. Odom
 Adebayo O. Ogunlesi
 Patrick Olivelle
 Victoria J. Orphan
 Eve Charis Ostriker
 Julie Overbaugh
 Ardem S. Patapoutian
 Ann Patchett
 Mary E. Pattillo
 Arogyaswami J. Paulraj
 Thoru Pederson
 Catherine L. Peichel
 Fernando C. N. Pereira
 Roderic I. Pettigrew
 Patricia Phelps de Cisneros
 Ann Philbin
 Philip W. Phillips
 Seth D. Pollak
 Daniel R. Porterfield
 Vincent E. Price
 Molly Przeworski
 Jie Qiao
 Suparna Rajaram
 Indira M. Raman
 Enrico Ramirez-Ruiz
 Guthrie P. Ramsey, Jr.
 Thomas A. Rando
 Claudia Rankine
 Alexander Razborov
 Jennifer A. Richeson
 Cristina M. Rodríguez
 Charles M. Roessel
 Peter A. Rogerson
 Carole Rothman
 Ronitt Rubinfeld
 Lauren M Ruetsche
 Cristine Russell
 Wendy Sandler
 Richmond Sarpong
 Greg Sarris
 Kenneth F. Scheve
 Maria Schneider
 Julie A. Segre
 Marjorie D. Shapiro
 Val C. Sheffield
 Robert F. Siliciano
 Eva Silverstein
 Kavita Singh
 Mario Luis Small
 Valerie Smith
 Alexander J. Smits
 David Soskice
 Marilda Antonia de Oliveira Sotomayor
 Eugene H. Spafford
 James P. Spillane
 George R. Stark
 G. Gabrielle Starr
 Kathleen J. Stebe
 Karen P. Steel
 Sarah Stillman
 James Stone
 Michael E. Stone
 Lisa T. Su
 Fumihiko Sueki
 Winnifred Fallers Sullivan
 Sarah Sze
 Sylvia R. Tamale
 Chandrika K. Tandon
 Ann Temkin
 Joshua B. Tenenbaum
 John K. Thornton
 Florencia Torche
 Tatiana Toro
 William M. Treanor
 Eve M. Troutt Powell
 Lyudmila N. Trut
 Chizuko Ueno
 Guadalupe Valdés
 Lynn Vavreck
 David G. Victor
 Suzanne Walker
 Kay WalkingStick
 Susan Scholes Wallace
 David Der-wei Wang
 Fan Wang
 Thomas E. Wellems
 Theodore V. Wells, Jr.
 Craig Steven Wilder
 Fred Wilson
 Teresa K. Woodruff
 Ngaire Tui Woods
 Clifford J. Woolf
 Kwesi Yankah
 Mihalis Yannakakis
 Leeat Yariv
 Xiaogang Ye
 Louise Young
 Muhammad Qasim Zaman
 Martin T. Zanni
 Barbie Zelizer

2021 

 Rafi Ahmed
 Zeresenay Alemseged
 Hilton Als
 José Enrique Alvarez
 Carol Anderson
 James D. Anderson
 James A. Banks
 Zhenan Bao
 Dafna Bar-Sagi
 Gilda A. Barabino
 Deanna M. Barch
 Alice Barkan
 David Stephen Battisti
 Ian Baucom
 John Baugh
 Richard Bauman
 Ruth Behar
 Joan W. Bennett
 Dirk Bergemann
 Cristina Bicchieri
 Terence O. Blanchard
 Thomas Boehm
 P. Dee Boersma
 L. Ebony Boulware
 Kristin Bowman-James
 Pascal R. Boyer
 Susan L. Brantley
 Ronald R. Breaker
 Linda J. Broadbelt
 Jericho Brown
 Nancy J. Brown
 Axel T. Brunger
 Virginia Burrus
 Robert L. Byer
 Hui Cao
 Peter Carmeliet
 Terri Lyne Carrington
 BJ Casey
 Ruth E. Chang
 Teju Cole
 Tony Coles
 Joy Connolly
 Kinshasha Holman Conwill
 Steven J. Corwin
 Kimberlé W. Crenshaw
 Michael M. Crow
 Angela Y. Davis
 Roger J. Davis
 Stefano DellaVigna
 Sharon Y. R. Dent
 Ulrike Diebold
 Mitchell Duneier
 Thu Huong Duong
 Odile Eisenstein
 Azza M.H. El Kholy
 Yakov Eliashberg
 Arturo Escobar
 James A. Estes
 John W. Etchemendy
 Bernardine Evaristo
 Benson S. Farb
 Robert Christopher Feenstra
 Carol A. Fierke
 Israel Finkelstein
 Katherine E. Fleming
 Virginia Page Fortna
 Andrea Gamarnik
 Rodolfo Gambini
 Barbara Geddes
 Ruth Wilson Gilmore
 Ananda Goldrath
 Fritz Graf
 Bernice Grafstein
 Linda G. Griffith
 Sanjay K. Gupta
 Evelynn M. Hammonds
 Michael G. Hanchard
 Nikole Hannah-Jones
 Valerie Hansen
 Maureen R. Hanson
 Demis Hassabis
 Tyrone B. Hayes
 Nathan L. Hecht
 Mary Kay Henry
 Maria L. Hinojosa
 Stephen P. Hinshaw
 Mary Dana Hinton
 Jennifer Homans
 Arthur L. Horwich
 Jeffrey A. Hubbell
 Gregory Huber
 Joseph T. Hupp
 Kaye G. Husbands Fealing
 David Henry Hwang
 Joseph Incandela
 Charles L. Isbell
 Akiko Iwasaki
 Herbert Jäckle
 Lisa P. Jackson
 Sandra Jackson-Dumont
 Arthur Jafa
 Sheila S. Jasanoff
 Sue Jinks-Robertson
 Anthony M. Johnson
 Marcia K. Johnson
 Rucker C. Johnson
 William D. Jones
 Vicky Kalogera
 Paula A. Kerger
 Robin Wall Kimmerer
 Ronald Kirk
 Perri Klass
 Mary E. Klotman
 Karin D. Knorr Cetina
 Judith Kroll
 Vijay Kumar
 Jane B. Lancaster
 George M. Langford
 Elisabeth Le Guin
 Chang-rae Lee
 Ralph S. Lemon
 Gillian Lester
 Amy-Jill Levine
 Fei-Fei Li
 Patricia Limerick
 Lúcia Garcez Lohmann
 Kelly Lytle Hernández
 Nancy Makri
 Anup Malani
 Luciano A. Marraffini
 Andrew David Martin
 Nader Masmoudi
 Nadya Mason
 Ann S. Masten
 James N. Mattis
 Deirdre N. McCloskey
 Thomas W. McDade
 Elizabeth McNally
 Muriel Médard
 Julie Mehretu
 Teresa H. Meng
 Federica Mogherini
 Valeria Molinero
 Luis Carlos Moll
 Michele Moody-Adams
 Tirin Moore
 Teresa Morgan
 Robert P. Moses
 David A. Moss
 Eileen A. Myles
 Na'ilah Suad Nasir
 Frederick Neuhouser
 Dianne K. Newman
 Michele L. Norris
 Larry Norton
 Kyoko Nozaki
 Jodi M. Nunnari
 Naomi Shihab Nye
 Angela V. Olinto
 Angela Onwuachi-Willig
 John G. Palfrey
 Patricia G. Parker
 Suzan-Lori Parks
 Malcolm J. Perry
 Jonas C. Peters
 Anthony B. Pinn
 Stanley A. Plotkin
 Daniel N. Posner
 Kavita Ramanan
 Jorge G. Ramos Ávalos
 Marilyn N. Raphael
 Jereldine Redcorn
 Hanna Reisler
 Andrés Reséndez
 Robbie Robertson
 Carol V. Robinson
 Barbara Rogoff
 Hannah Mary Rothschild
 Charles N. Rotimi
 Kim K. Sajet
 Richard G. Salomon
 Leona D. Samson
 James Joseph Sandman
 Eric L. Santner
 Kirk Savage
 Stefan Savage
 Howard D. Schultz
 Kenneth S. Schweizer
 Ruth Scodel
 Rosalind A. Segal
 Mordechai (Moti) Segev
 Margo I. Seltzer
 Rajiv Shah
 Stewart D. Shapiro
 Scott Sheffield
 J. Nicole Shelton
 Yanan Shen
 J. Marshall Shepherd
 Frederick J. Sigworth
 Peter L. Slavin
 Karen E. Smith
 Linda Tuhiwai Te Rina Smith
 Sonya T. Smith
 Victoria L. Sork
 Daniel A. Spielman
 Hortense J. Spillers
 Gayatri Chakravorty Spivak
 Sharada Srinivasan
 Stefanie Stantcheva
 Kumble R. Subbaswamy
 Kara Swisher
 Esther S. Takeuchi
 Deborah F. Tannen
 Kathryn E. Tanner
 Jill Tarter
 Anne M. Thompson
 Ayanna Thompson
 Ginger Thompson
 H. Holden Thorp
 Sarah A. Tishkoff
 Haunani-Kay Trask
 Rosemarie Trockel
 Li-Huei Tsai
 Eric Turkheimer
 Karel van der Toorn
 Geerat J. Vermeij
 Ashvin Vishwanath
 Annette Vissing-Jørgensen
 Keith A. Wailoo
 Vanessa Siddle Walker
 R. Jay Wallace
 Ebonya L. Washington
 Daniel H. Weiss
 Jennifer M. Welsh
 Stephen C. West
 Amie Wilkinson
 Deborah Willis
 Mabel O. Wilson
 Oprah Winfrey
 Paula Wolff
 Catherine S. Woolley
 Dawn J. Wright
 Lawrence Wright
 Hao Wu
 Amir Yacoby
 Nieng Yan
 Deborah J. Yashar
 Anne D. Yoder
 Richard J. Youle
 Paul Zanker
 Kenneth S. Zaret
 Marino Zerial

2022 

 Alberto Abadie
 Carolyn Abbate
 Kyle Abraham
 Alice Rangel de Paiva Abreu
 Claire Adjiman
 John Agnew
 Maya Ajmera
 Cristina M. Alberini
 John R. Allen
 Walter R. Allen
 Bárbara Arroyo
 Chieko Asakawa
 O. Keith Baker
 W. Mitchell Baker
 Ralph S. Baric
 Jeffrey A. Barrett
 Luiz André Barroso
 Regina Barzilay
 Sven Beckert
 David A. Bell
 Nancy Bermeo
 Christopher R. Berry
 Roman Bezrukavnikov
 Kirsten B. Bibbins-Domingo
 Rena Bizios
 Eve Blau
 Suzanne Preston Blier
 Charles M. Boone
 Susan Bordo
 Richard Gutierrez Bribiescas
 Adriana D. Briscoe
 Joan B. Broderick
 Richard R.W. Brooks
 Wendy L. Brown
 Robert D. Bullard
 Robert Calderbank
 Wendy Carlin
 Marvin A. Carlson
 Bridget O. Carragher
 Nancy Carrasco
 Mary N. Carrington
 Avshalom Caspi
 Gerbrand Ceder
 Guy-Uriel E. Charles
 Erica Chenoweth
 Jamsheed K. Choksy
 Sandra Chung
 Sandra Cisneros
 Glenn Close
 Jonathan D. Cohen
 Carl A. Cohn
 Patricia Hill Collins
 Cesar R. Conde
 Michael B. Cosmopoulos
 Eileen M. Crimmins
 Marian R. Croak
 Panagiota Daskalopoulos
 Peter L. de Bolla
 Carlos del Rio
 Donatella della Porta
 Lynda F. Delph
 Arshad B. Desai
 Anthony Di Fiore
 Christopher R. Dickman
 Thomas A. DiPrete
 Michael F. Doherty
 Michele Dougherty
 Justin Driver
 Jan Willem Duyvendak
 Susan M. Dynarski
 Lauren Edelman
 Jennifer Elisseeff
 Naomi Ellemers
 Oskar Eustis
 Michale S. Fee
 Anne Feldhaus
 Teresita Fernández
 Martha Albertson Fineman
 William H. Foege
 Efi Foufoula-Georgiou
 Gordon J. Freeman
 Patricia C. Gándara
 Wilfrid Gangbo
 Mariano A. Garcia-Blanco
 Claudine Gay
 Rhiannon Giddens
 Sam Gilliam
 Sherry Glied
 Yale E. Goldman
 Robert W. Gordon
 Véronique Gouverneur
 David J. Grain
 Virginia Gray
 Wendy Griswold
 Eduardo A. Groisman
 James Gross
 Robert I. Grossman
 Chenghua Gu
 Alice Guionnet
 Miguel Gutierrez
 Hahrie C. Han
 Bernard A. Harris
 Saidiya V. Hartman
 Caroline S. Harwood
 Mark E. Hay
 Rebecca W. Heald
 Peter Hegemann
 Steven Henikoff
 Haruzo Hida
 Bo E. Honoré
 Ayanna M. Howard
 Z. Josh Huang
 Andreas Huyssen
 Richard Ivry
 C. Kirabo Jackson
 Robert B. Jackson
 Suzanne Jackson
 Catherine L. Johnson
 Camara Phyllis Jones
 Marc Bamuthi Joseph
 Shamit Kachru
 Wadad Kadi
 Katalin Karikó
 Sabine Kastner
 Dina Katabi
 Lisa Kewley
 Mark Kisin
 Rachel E. Klevit
 Hank Klibanoff
 Dorothy Y. Ko
 Gabriel Kotliar
 Nicholas A. Kotov
 Diana Slaughter Kotzin
 Leonid Kruglyak
 Alessandra Lanzara
 Jennifer Lee
 Raphael C. Lee
 Tracy S. Letts
 Jacob Lew
 Yiyun Y. Li
 Peter B. Littlewood
 Elisabeth A. Lloyd
 Bette A. Loiselle
 Leonardo N. López Luján
 Joni Lovenduski
 Shelly Lundberg
 Oren Lyons
 Susana A. Magallón Puebla
 James L. Mahoney
 Harmit Singh Malik
 Sally Mann
 Howard S. Marks
 Robert A. Martienssen
 Georges P. Martin
 Tshilidzi Marwala
 Eduardo Matos Moctezuma
 Khaled Mattawa
 Stephen Leon Mayo
 Rafe Mazzeo
 Dwight A. McBride
 Vonnie McLoyd
 Jefferson A. McMahan
 Jill Medvedow
 Ruslan Medzhitov
 Matthew L. Meyerson
 Terrie E. Moffitt
 Jason J. Moran
 Wesley Morris
 S. Harvey Moseley
 Marsha A. Moses
 Fred Moten
 Dambisa F. Moyo
 Sabyasachi Mukherjee
 Andrew G. Myers
 Peter M. Narins
 Richard Neer
 Mae Ngai
 Sianne Ngai
 Jean M. O'Brien
 Karen Oegema
 Oyekunle Olukotun
 Santa J. Ono
 Tracy P. Palandjian
 Rohini Pande
 Maharaj K. Pandit
 Jean William Pape
 Manuel Pastor
 Martha E. Pollack
 Anna Marie Prentiss
 Laura J. Pyrak-Nolte
 Ronald T. Raines
 Ramamoorthy Ramesh
 Zihe Rao
 Ishmael Scott Reed
 Aviv Regev
 David Relman
 Alison F. Richard
 Heather Cox Richardson
 Dorothy E. Roberts
 Beate Roessler
 Pamela C. Ronald
 Elisabeth Rosenthal
 Esteban Rossi-Hansberg
 Daniel I. Rubenstein
 Salman Rushdie
 Buffy Sainte-Marie
 Nicholas Sambanis
 Juan G. Santiago
 Rebecca R. Saxe
 Dietram A. Scheufele
 Bambi B. Schieffelin
 M. Emanuela Scribano
 Jonathan L. Sessler
 Karen C. Seto
 H. Bradley Shaffer
 Nilay Shah
 Adi Shamir
 Joan-Emma Shea
 Nancy Sherman
 Li Shuicheng
 Patricia Smith
 Sara A. Solla
 Nancy R. Sottos
 Johanna Stachel
 Shannon S. Stahl
 Samuel L. Stanley, Jr.
 Jón Steinsson
 Molly M. Stevens
 Anne Marie Sweeney
 Endre Szemerédi
 Elie Tamer
 William F. Tate IV
 Marleen Temmerman
 Hank Willis Thomas
 Kevin Thompson
 Jenny P. Ting
 Maria Todorova
 Virginia L. Trimble
 Nachum Ulanovsky
 Peter S. Ungar
 Leslie G. Valiant
 Alexander van Oudenaarden
 Blaire Van Valkenburgh
 James C. VanderKam
 George Varghese
 Carlos G. Vélez-Ibáñez
 Archana Venkatesan
 Abraham C. Verghese
 Claire Voisin
 Richard J. Walker
 Drew Weissman
 Sandra K. Weller
 Eleanor Wilner
 David Kwabena Wilson
 Suzanne M. Wilson
 Sijue Wu
 Omar M. Yaghi
 Linda T. Zagzebski
 Matias Zaldarriaga
 Ana Celia Zentella
 Min Zhou

 International Honorary Member

References 

2020